Elvin C. "Kink" Richards (December 27, 1910 – July 21, 1976) was an American football running back in the National Football League for the New York Giants.  He first played college football at the former Baptist school known as Des Moines University (not to be confused with the unrelated current school of the same name) before transferring to Simpson College.

References

1910 births
1976 deaths
American football running backs
New York Giants players
Simpson Storm football players
People from Decatur County, Iowa
Players of American football from Iowa